Eastville Mercantile, also known as Eastville Drugstore, is a historic commercial building located at Eastville, Northampton County, Virginia. It was built about 1850, and is a two-story, rectangular frame building located in the center of the town's historic main thoroughfare. It measures 18 feet wide by 50 feet deep and has a front gable roof with unadorned bargeboard.  It is in the form of a traditional Chesapeake store. The first floor contains a large rectangular sales room and a small counting room, while the second floor contains a storage room and an apartment.

It was listed on the National Register of Historic Places in 2005.  It is located in the Eastville Historical District.

References

Commercial buildings on the National Register of Historic Places in Virginia
Commercial buildings completed in 1850
Buildings and structures in Northampton County, Virginia
National Register of Historic Places in Northampton County, Virginia
Individually listed contributing properties to historic districts on the National Register in Virginia
1850 establishments in Virginia